Tunis is the capital and largest city of Tunisia.

Tunis may also refer to:

Places and jurisdictions
 Tunis, Faiyum Governorate, Egypt, a village
 Tunis, Sohag Governorate, Egypt, a village
 Tunis, Ontario, Canada, a community
 Tunis, Texas, United States, an unincorporated community and census-designated place
 Tunis Lake, a reservoir in New York, United States
 Tunis Eyalet, former autonomous state under the Ottoman Empire in North Africa
 Tunis Governorate, a governorate (province) of Tunisia
 6362 Tunis, an asteroid
 Beylik of Tunis, a monarchy in Northern Africa between 1705 and 1881
 Gulf of Tunis, Tunisia
 Lake of Tunis, a natural lagoon between the city of Tunis and the Gulf of Tunis
 Roman Catholic Archdiocese of Tunis
 Tunis Run, a tributary of White Deer Creek in Centre County, Pennsylvania, United States

People
 Tunis Campbell (1812–1891), African-American politician and clergyman
 Tunis Craven (1813–1864), US Navy officer
 T.A.M. Craven (1893–1972), US Navy officer and commissioner of the Federal Communications Commission
 Edwin Tunis (1897–1973), American author
 John R. Tunis (1889–1975), American sports journalist and novelist
 Staffan Tunis (born 1982), Finnish ski-orienteering competitor

Sports
 Tunis Grand Prix, an auto race held in the 1920s and 1930s in Tunis, Tunisia
 Tunis Open, a tennis tournament

Other uses
 TUNIS (Toronto University System), a UNIX-like operating system developed at the University of Toronto
 Tunis (sheep), a sheep breed
 Tunis University, Tunisia
 Battle of Tunis (255 BC), a Carthaginian victory over the Romans in the First Punic War
 Slap of Tunis, an expression used by the Italians in the 19th century
 Tunis 2050, a Tunisian television sitcom
 , a Danish cargo ship

See also
 
 Tunisia
 Tunes (disambiguation)